Communauté d'agglomération Hérault Méditerranée is the communauté d'agglomération, an intercommunal structure, centred on the town of Agde. It is located in the Hérault department, in the Occitania region, southern France. Created in 2002, its seat is in Saint-Thibéry. Its area is 386.6 km2. Its population was 80,259 in 2019, of which 29,600 in Agde proper.

Composition
The communauté d'agglomération consists of the following 20 communes:

Adissan
Agde
Aumes
Bessan
Castelnau-de-Guers
Caux
Cazouls-d'Hérault
Florensac
Lézignan-la-Cèbe
Montagnac
Nézignan-l'Évêque
Nizas
Pézenas
Pinet
Pomérols
Portiragnes
Saint-Pons-de-Mauchiens
Saint-Thibéry
Tourbes
Vias

References

Herault Mediterranee
Herault Mediterranee